Jung Hae-in (born April 1, 1988) is a South Korean actor. He first made an appearance in AOA Black's music video for "Moya" in 2013 and officially debuted through the TV series Bride of the Century the next year. He gained recognition for his main role in 2017 television series While You Were Sleeping and for his supporting role in Prison Playbook. Jung had his first lead role in the 2018 drama Something in the Rain, and followed with One Spring Night in 2019. Jung gained even greater recognition through his lead roles in D.P. (2021) and Snowdrop (2021–22).

Career

Beginnings
Jung's first acting experience was through a musical in college, however his determination to become an actor was established when he was in the military service and he lost 12 kilograms in order to achieve his dream. He debuted at the age of twenty-six.

Jung officially debuted in 2014 through the TV series Bride of the Century and then appeared in the indie film The Youth. The same year, he was cast in the historical series The Three Musketeers. He then appeared in small roles and made several cameo appearances for various TV series and films from 2014 to 2016. One of his memorable appearances was in Guardian: The Lonely and Great God as Kim Go-eun's first love.

2017–present: Rise in popularity and lead roles
In 2017, Jung gained popularity with his performance in fantasy romance series While You Were Sleeping. During its airing, he ranked as the Number 1 searched term on Korean portal site Naver. Two of his historical movies, The King's Case Note and Conspiracy: Age of Rebellion, were released in the same year. He was next cast in the black comedy series Prison Playbook, where he received praise for his performance as an imprisoned Army captain convicted of assaulting a soldier in his unit who later died.

In 2018, Jung appeared in another historical film Heung-boo: The Revolutionist where he played the character of King Heonjong. He landed his first leading role in the romance drama Something in the Rain alongside Son Ye-jin. Following the airing of the drama, Jung experienced a rise in popularity in Asia. Later that year, Jung was cast in the period romance film Tune in for Love alongside Kim Go-eun.

In 2019, Jung starred in the youth film Start-Up as a school drop out who ends up in a gang. The same year he was cast in the romance drama One Spring Night alongside Han Ji-min, helmed by the director and writer of Something in the Rain.

In 2020, Jung starred in romance drama A Piece of Your Mind alongside Chae Soo-bin. In the same year, he joined on JTBC drama Snowdrop alongside Jisoo, which was helmed by Sky Castle writer and producer and premiered in December 2021.

In 2021, Jung starred in the Netflix series D.P. as a Military Police soldier tasked with pursuing deserters. The same year he joined the Watcha original short film Unframed with Lee Je-hoon directing and writing the script.

In 2022, Jung starred in the Disney+ drama Connect. He is set to reprise his role in the second season of D.P in 2023.

Personal life

Family and graduation degree
Jung Hae-in's third great-grandfather is Jeong Yak-yong, a great thinker of the later Joseon period. He graduated with a degree in Broadcasting Entertainment Department at Pyeongtaek University, where he participated in various activities including musical plays.

Military enlistment
He enlisted in the military when he was twenty-one years old. He signed a contract with his agency after being discharged from the military and graduating from college.

Public relations

Fan meetings
Jung held his first fan meeting in Seoul on July 28, 2018, at Kyunghee University Hall of Peace, followed by fan meetings in Taipei, Bangkok, Hong Kong and Manila.

Filmography

Film

Television series

Web series

Television shows

Hosting

Discography

Singles

Accolades

Awards and nominations

State honors

Listicles

Notes

References

External links

 
 
 Jung Hae-in at FNC Entertainment

1988 births
Living people
Male actors from Seoul
FNC Entertainment artists
South Korean male television actors
South Korean male film actors
21st-century South Korean male actors